Delroy Cambridge (born 12 November 1949) is a Jamaican professional golfer.

Professional career 
Cambridge turned professional in 1971. He has spent many years in the United States, where he worked as an assistant professional at Sunningdale Country Club in Scarsdale, New York and played in local and regional events in the New York region. 

He is more notable for his achievements in senior (over 50) golf. In 2000, he became the first Jamaican to qualify to play on the European Seniors Tour and he made the top-25 on that tour's Order of Merit every year from 2001 to 2006, with a best ranking of third in 2002. He has won five European Senior Tour tournaments.

In November 2010, he nearly won a senior event in Australia. He held the lead entering the final round of the Fiducian Legends Australian PGA Championship. He led by three shots entering the 16th hole of the final round. However he finished triple bogey-par-bogey to finish runner-up to Australian golfer Lyndsay Stephen.

Professional wins (7)

Regular career wins (2)
This list is probably incomplete
1994 Westchester Open
1998 Jamaica Open

European Senior Tour wins (5)

European Senior Tour playoff record (1–2)

Jamaica national team appearances
World Cup: 1996, 1998, 2006

References

External links

Trinidad Guardian article

Jamaican male golfers
European Senior Tour golfers
People from Mandeville, Jamaica
People from Scarsdale, New York
Golfers from Orlando, Florida
1949 births
Living people